Fryšták is a town in Zlín District in the Zlín Region of the Czech Republic. It has about 3,700 inhabitants. The historic town centre is well preserved and is protected by law as an urban monument zone.

Administrative parts

Villages of Dolní Ves, Horní Ves and Vítová are administrative parts of Fryšták.

Geography
It lies on the Fryštácký stream. Northern part of the municipal territory lies in the Hostýn-Vsetín Mountains, rest of the territory lies in the Vizovice Highlands. It lies on the border between ethnographic regions of Moravian Wallachia and Hanakia.

In the southern part of Fryšták on the Fryštácký stream, the Fryšták Reservoir is located. It was built in 1935–1938 as a water source for Zlín. Since 1997 it has been protected as a cultural monument.

History
The first written mention of Fryšták is from 15 January 1356 under its Latin name Freystat. In 1382, Fryšták was described as a prosperous town with trade, crafts, a slaughterhouse and a spa. The prosperity was interrupted by the Thirty Years' War.

By the 19th century, Fryšták was notable for agriculture and wood production. The fire of 1841 caused Fryšták's traditional wooden buildings to be replaced by more modern buildings. By the latter 20th century a contemporary wave of building with construction of many new houses included the installation of modern infrastructure such as natural gas lines and telephone networks.

Demographics

Sights

The landmark of the town is the Church of Saint Nicholas. The building is not architecturally clean, it can best be described as a baroque building. The original part of the church is from the 16th century, in 1820 the building was extended and the bell tower was replaced by a new one. The baroque stone cross in front of the church is from 1763.

The first stone town hall was built in Fryšták in 1680. The old building was replaced by a new one in 1900.

Notable people
Jaroslav Kvapil (1892–1958), composer, conductor and pianist
Břetislav Bakala (1897–1958), conductor, pianist and composer
Václav Renč (1911–1973), poet, dramatist and translator; lived here
Dalibor Brázda (1921–2005), Czech-Swiss composer, arranger and conductor

Twin towns – sister cities

Fryšták is twinned with:
 Kanianka, Slovakia
 Muráň, Slovakia

References

External links

Cities and towns in the Czech Republic
Populated places in Zlín District